Martin Vorhees "Mike" Bergen Jr. (January 29, 1872 – July 8, 1941) was an American football player, coach, and lawyer.  He served as the head football coach at Grinnell College (1894–1895, 1902–1903, 1905) and at the University of Virginia (1896–1897), compiling a career college football record of 38–22–6.  

Bergen died of a heart attack at the age of 69 on July 8, 1941, in his apartment at the Racquet Club in Center City Philadelphia.  He was the son of Christopher A. Bergen, United States Congressman who represented New Jersey's 1st congressional district from 1889 to 1893.

Head coaching record

References

External links
 

1872 births
1941 deaths
19th-century players of American football
American football fullbacks
American football halfbacks
Grinnell Pioneers football coaches
Princeton Tigers baseball players
Princeton Tigers football coaches
Princeton Tigers football players
Virginia Cavaliers football coaches
New Jersey lawyers
Pennsylvania lawyers
Sportspeople from Camden, New Jersey
Players of American football from Camden, New Jersey
Players of American football from Philadelphia